Jeff Mensah (born 10 August 1992) is a Danish former professional footballer who played as a midfielder.

Career
Born in Viborg, Mensah began his senior career with Viborg in the 2009–10 season. He joined Skive on loan in February 2015. He was released by Viborg in May 2016, at the end of his contract. He spent the second half of 2016 in Norway with Hødd. He returned to Denmark with Thisted in January 2017. He returned to Viborg for the  2018–19 season.

On 29 January 2022, 29-year old Mensah announced, that he had decided to retire from football.

Personal life
Mensah is of Ghanaian descent. He is the brother of the footballer Kevin Mensah.

Honours
Viborg
Danish 1st Division: 2012–13, 2020–21

References

1992 births
Living people
Danish men's footballers
Danish people of Ghanaian descent
Viborg FF players
Skive IK players
IL Hødd players
Thisted FC players
Danish 1st Division players
Danish Superliga players
Association football midfielders
Danish expatriate men's footballers
Danish expatriate sportspeople in Norway
Expatriate footballers in Norway
People from Viborg Municipality
Sportspeople from the Central Denmark Region